The Renfrew County Catholic District School Board (RCCDSB, known as English-language Separate District School Board No. 28 prior to 1999)is the administrative body that manages the operations of the Catholic primary and secondary schools in the County of Renfrew in Ontario, Canada.

Organization
The Renfrew County Catholic District School Board runs 19 primary schools and 2 secondary schools, all of which are English, separate schools. Between the 22 schools the Renfrew County Catholic District School Board has 550 employees that provide education for over 5000 students in 16 different communities.  The Renfrew County Catholic District School Board is 1 of 72 school boards in Ontario. The administrative office is located in Pembroke, Ontario. The current Director of Education is Michele Arbour and the Chairperson of the Board of Trustees is Bob Michaud.

Secondary schools

Primary schools

N/A denotes no vice principal is present in the school.

Administration

See also
 List of school districts in Ontario
 List of high schools in Ontario

References

External links
 

Education in Renfrew County
Roman Catholic school districts in Ontario
Pembroke, Ontario